Neil Hallett (born 1980) is a retired English rugby union player who played at either full-back, centre or fly-half Neil is a coach at Wimbledon.  An excellent kicker, Hallett is best known for his time at Esher where he scored over 1,300 points for the club in all competitions, and he is also one of the most prolific scorers  in tier 3 history (2nd all-time as of 2016-17) with over 1,400 league points scored from his time spent with at four different clubs including Esher and Ealing Trailfinders.  As well as playing club rugby Hallett has also captained Surrey (winning three County Championship Shield titles) and been capped by the Barbarians and England Counties XV.

Career

Club career 

After starting his career at Rosslyn Park, Hallett moved to fellow National 2 side, Bracknell, mid-way through the 2002-03 season in order to gain first team rugby.  It was at Bracknell that he came to prominence, enjoying an outstanding 2003-04 season which saw him come 3rd top scorer in the division with 239 points helping his side to a very respectable 7th-place finish.  Despite starting the 2004-05 season with Bracknell, after just 4 games Hallett decided to join divisional rivals, Esher.  It proved to be the correct decision as by the end of the season Bracknell were relegated while Esher (just) managed to stay up, with Hallett's kicking contributing greatly to his new club's survival.  The period between 2005-07 was Halletts best at Esher, finishing as the divisions top scorer twice (with 302 and 398 points respectively) and culminating in the Surrey club winning the league title and promotion at the end of the 2006-07 campaign.  He helped the club survive several years in tier 2 but a change to the divisional structure at the end of the 2008-09 season involving the creation of the RFU Championship meant that Esher were  relegated back to tier 3 despite finishing in 12th spot.

In the summer of 2010, despite having a bit-part role in Esher's promotion from National League 1 to the Championship, Hallett decided to leave the club to join Ealing Trailfinders, playing two divisions below in National League 2 South.  Back enjoying first team rugby, Hallett was part of an excellent Trailfinders side that stormed to the title, contributing 337 points in a side that included the prolific Phil Chesters who scored a record-breaking 70 tries that year.  He spent a further season at the club as they just missed out on a successive promotion to Jersey before deciding to join London regional side Wimbledon as a player-coach for the 2012-13 season, combining playing with teaching at Wimbledon College.  He would play the final years of his career at Wimbledon, helping them to the London 1 South title in 2015 before retiring at the end of the 2016-17 season, having helped his promoted side to a mid-table finish in National League 3 London & SE.

Representative career 

Following an excellent debut season with Esher, Hallett was selected for the Surrey squad taking part in the 2005 County Plate (now Shield) competition.  He took his good form into the competition that summer, helping his county to qualify from the group stage which included a man-of-the-match performance in the 38-22 win against Dorset & Wilts, scoring 28 points.   After winning their semi-final fixture, Surrey faced Somerset in the Twickenham final.  Having already beaten the south-west side in the group stages, Surrey once again proved too strong, Hallett contributing 9 points from the boot as he helped his side to their first taste of County Championship silverware since 1971.

His performances at club and county drew the interest of the Barbarians who included Hallett in their 2006 tour.  He made his Barbarians debut in the last game of the tour, contributing a try and conversion and being named man-of-the-match as his side won 28-19 against the Georgian national team in Tbilisi in June.  Further call-ups to the Barbarians would follow the next season, with appearances against the Combined Services, East Midlands and British Army to follow, although he would fail to score any further points for the Ba-Baas.  In February 2007 he also made his England Counties XV debut, scoring 10 points in a 17-20 loss against an Irish Club XV at Donnybrook.  A second Counties appearance followed in March, with Hallet contributing 21 points, including 2 tries, as England Counties beat France Amateurs 41-10 at the Rectory Field.

Towards the end of his career playing at Wimbledon, Hallett was still very much involved with the Surrey County side.  He was called up to take part in his counties 2013 County Championship Shield campaign (formerly known as the plate) and was made captain.  Despite being in the twilight of his career, Hallet showed that class was permanent, contributing 61 points including 3 tries as Surrey stormed their way through to the final.  At Twickenham Surrey managed to overcome a resolute Cumbria 21-16, with Hallett's 11 points, including 3 penalties, proving to be vital as his county won their second Shield title.  The following season, Hallett would return to county action for the last team, captaining newly promoted in the 2014 County Championship Plate competition.  Once again Hallet was outstanding as Surrey went on to win the Plate competition, contributing 73 points overall.  He saved his strongest performance for the final with a massive 24 points including 6 penalties helping Surrey overcome Leicestershire 39-16.

Season-by-season playing stats

Club

County/Representative

Honours and records 

Esher
National Division 2 top points scorer (2): 2005-06 (302 points), 2006-07 (398 points)
National League 1 champions (2): 2006-07, 2009-10

Ealing Trailfinders
National League 2 South champions: 2010-11

Wimbledon
London 1 South champions: 2014-15

Barbarians
Capped 4 times: 2005-07

Surrey
County Championship Shield winners (2): 2005, 2013
County Championship Plate winners: 2014

Notes

References

External links 
England RFU
Barbarian FC
Surrey RFU
Rosslyn Park FC
Bracknell RFC
Esher RFC
Ealing Trailfinders
Wimbledon RFC

1980 births
Living people
Barbarian F.C. players
English rugby union players
Esher RFC players
Rugby union centres
Rugby union fly-halves
Rugby union fullbacks
Rugby union players from Hammersmith